The , also called the , is a privately compiled anthology of waka and kanshi compiled between 893 and 913.

Compilation and date
The work is in two volumes, the first having been compiled in 893 and the second being added in 913. Its compilation is traditionally attributed to the great scholar and kanshi poet Sugawara no Michizane, but other theories have been proposed. The attribution was first made in the eleventh century, and is today accepted by most scholars. Even if Michizane wrote the poetry himself, he could not have composed the preface to the second volume, which is dated 913, ten years after Michizane's death.

Style
The text consists of alternating waka and kanshi on the same theme. The waka are written in Man'yōgana, similarly to the Man'yōshū.

Notes

References

Bibliography

External links
Scanned copy of full text available from the National Institute of Japanese Literature.

10th-century Japanese books
Early Middle Japanese texts
Japanese books
Japanese-language books
Kanshi (poetry)
Waka (poetry)
913
10th century in Japan
Sugawara no Michizane
Shisenshū